United Pier (1933–1994) was a ferry pier in Central, Hong Kong. It was located at Jubilee Street, so it was formerly named "Jubilee Street Pier".

History 
The pier opened in 1933, providing berths for the ferries to Jordan Road, Mong Kok, Sham Shui Po, Cheung Chau and Silvermine Bay, and vehicular ferries to Yau Ma Tei. It was demolished in 1994 to make way for the Central and Wan Chai Reclamation. The MTR Airport Express Hong Kong station and Four Seasons Hotel were then built on the reclaimed land.

References

Central, Hong Kong
Buildings and structures completed in 1933
Buildings and structures demolished in 1994
Demolished piers in Hong Kong
Victoria Harbour